Lago di Piediluco is a lake that straddles the border between the Province of Terni, Umbria, Italy and the Province of Rieti, Lazio. At an elevation of 375 m, its surface area is 1.58 km². The lake is formed by the inflow of water from three sources: the Rio Fuscello, the Velino river and the Nera river. The flow from the Rio Fuscello is naturally occurring, while the flows from the Nera and Velino rivers are each influenced in some part due to man-made means. A partial diversion of the Nera in the Nera river valley (Valnerina) conducts the flow via a lengthy aqueduct and canal system built in the 1920s during the fascist regime of Benito Mussolini, entering the lake at the north-western end of the village of Piediluco, near the entrance to the town from the "Via Ternana" SS79 motorway. A canal of approximately 400 meters' length was built, also in the 1920s, to divert the Velino river from its existing natural course into the lake. The purpose of this work was to improve hydroelectric power production.

At one time the lake was part of a much larger lake, known from Roman times as "Lacus Velinus" or Lake Velino. Lake Piediluco was formed as a result of cuts downstream from the lake that drained the waters of Lake Velino into the lower Nera River, which also created the Cascata delle Marmore waterfall. Lake Piediluco is the site of the Italian National Rowing Center, which hosts many training and competition events at the national, European, and international level. The lake is ideal for the sport due to its shape, central geographical location, and the relatively calm winds.

External links

Lakes of Umbria
Lakes of Lazio